Daniela Romo (born Teresa Presmanes Corona; 27 August 1959) is a Mexican singer, actress and TV hostess. During her career, she has sold 17 million records, making her one of the best-selling Latin music artists.

Biography 
Born Teresa Presmanes Corona on 27 August 1959, in Mexico City, Mexico, her parents never married, and Daniela and her sister Patricia were raised by their grandmother. As a child she idolized Rocío Dúrcal, whom she credits for inspiring her to become an actress and a recording artist.

Performing in stage shows such as Gypsy, Romo eventually ventured out into film and television where she would gain recognition making her film debut in La casa del pelícano at the age of 17. Her first starring role on a television soap opera (or telenovela) was in 1978 in El Ardiente Secreto, an adaptation of Jane Eyre.

During her TV era, Romo would go on talk shows or variety shows of the time and sing. During this time, Chucho Ferrer, a popular producer at the time, saw the potential in Romo and offered to produce a record. An ambitious 20-year-old Romo took on this adventure and recorded her debut record También Yo (also released as Te pareces tanto a mí in 1985) released by CBS Records. All of these songs were written by singer-songwriter Lolita de la Colina. The album largely flopped due to the kind of material Romo was singing (mature balladry) and the public wasn't ready to take on this from such a young singer. Romo went on to do more film and TV, again garnering a hit on television with her soap Déjame vivir in 1982.

After six years away from television, Romo made her return to the small screen in the 1995 hit Si Dios me quita la vida alongside César Évora and Omar Fierro. The telenovela was followed by the variety show Hoy con Daniela in 1996. The show was largely panned by critics and was cancelled after two seasons due to poor ratings. In 2001, however, she hosted Univision's short-lived primetime game show A Millón. That same year, she also won her first roles as a villain in El Manantial, and was then seen in the lighthearted comedy Las vias del amor a year later.

In 2005, Romo released Es la Nostalgia, a collection of acoustic ballads produced by Adrian Posse and that same year, she garnered much praise for her role as the evil Doña Juana in the period soap Alborada. In 2006, Romo produced the musical Cabaret in Mexico and in 2009 was the star in Victor/Victoria on stage. In 2008, Romo starred in the TV serie Mujeres asesinas. She starred in the telenovelas Sortilegio (2009) and Triunfo del amor (2010).

Music career
Daniela Romo started out young singing back up to Los Hermanos Zavala before venturing out on stage.

In 1983, she traveled to Spain and met Danilo Vaona through her good friend Miguel Bosé. Danilo was famous at the time as an up-and-coming young Italian producer behind Raffaella Carrà among others. She recorded Daniela Romo under a new label, Hispavox. Her first single "Mentiras" caused a stir in Spain as during this time she was hosting a late night talk show in that country.

Her EMI debut album was a smash producing her No. 1 hit singles "Mentiras", "Celos" (written by José Luis Perales), "Pobre Secretaria" (written by Miguel Bosè), "La Ocasión Para Amarnos" and the ballad "Corazón", which served as the theme to the telenovela Un Sólo Corazón.

Romo's musical career soon devoured all of her time and for the next 4 years, she would dedicate all her attention to it. In 1984 she released her 3rd album Amor Prohibido which garnered her biggest International hit "Yo No Te Pido La Luna". The song was a smash all over Latin America and Spain, where the song was originally released in Italian by Fiordaliso titled "Non voglio mica la luna". She followed this record with Dueña de mi Corazón, which would be her last Danilo Vaona produced record for 11 years. She will work again with him in 1995 producing the album "Un Nuevo Amor".

1986 was a big year for Daniela Romo. This marked her return to television with arguably her best role to date in a telenovela with El Camino Secreto. The theme song to the telenovela was sung by Daniela Romo and was written by Juan Gabriel titled "De Mí Enamórate". This song proved to be Romo's biggest hit in Mexico, spending 21 weeks in the No. 1 position. It also achieved similar status in the US with the new Billboard Hot Latin Tracks, where it spent 14 weeks in the top spot.

Her record Mujer de todos, Mujer de nadie was released this year containing her smash. It was produced by Felisatti/J. R. Florez, the Midas touch hit men of Mexican 1980s pop. This would be her only record produced by this dynamic duo but it produced some of her biggest hits such as the gay anthem "Coco Loco", the ballad "Adelante Corazón", "Veneno Para Dos" and the title track.

Romo's musical career took a turn in 1989 when she released Quiero Amanecer con Alguien produced by Bebu Silvetti. The record was a musical change, adapting to balladry and simpler arrangements, more in the vein of Adult Contemporary pop music. This was a risky moved but it paid off as this record was a huge hit on an international scale. She would keep recording and in 1993, she signed a new record contract with Melody/Fonovisa where she would release 3 albums over the next 4 years. The same year, Romo was nominated for Female Pop Artist of the Year at the Lo Nuestro Awards.

The album Ave Fénix released in 2001 was produced by Loris Ceroni and was largely inspired by Cher's comeback effort Believe, adopting her smooth vocals with dance beats. It was largely ignored because Romo would go on to do telenovelas instead of promoting it.

Todo Todo Todo
A line dance was created for her "Todo, Todo, Todo" song in the 1990s. The song is a De rigueur at Filipino formal hall parties.

Discography

Studio albums
2015: La voz del corazón
2005: Es la Nostalgia
2001: Ave Fénix
1999: Me Vuelves Loca
1996: Un nuevo amor
1992: De Mil Colores
1991: Amada más que nunca
1989: Quiero Amanecer con Alguien
1987: Gitana
1986: Mujer de todos, Mujer de nadie
1985: Dueña de mi Corazón
1984: Amor Prohibido
1983: Daniela Romo

Live albums/covers and compilations
2012: Para Soñar
2008: Sueños de Cabaret
1998: En Vivo Desde el Teatro Alameda
1994: La Cita
1979: También Yo

Thematic albums
2009: Cuando Hay Amor, No Hay Pecado Sortilegio
1999: Juan Pablo Esperanza, Amigo del Alma
1999: Los Cuates de Chabelo
1996: Me gusta J.S Bach Remix
1986: Especiales de Navidad
1986: Érase una vez, Cuentos y relatos musicales
1986: Coco Loco Dance Mix
1983: Canta en Italiano

Filmography

Films

Television

Awards and nominations

Collaborations

References

External links
Official website

1959 births
Living people
Mexican child actresses
Mexican telenovela actresses
Mexican television actresses
Mexican film actresses
Mexican stage actresses
Mexican female dancers
Ballad musicians
Mexican television presenters
Actresses from Mexico City
Singers from Mexico City
20th-century Mexican actresses
21st-century Mexican actresses
People from Mexico City
Latin Grammy Lifetime Achievement Award winners
Mexican women pop singers
Mexican women television presenters
Women in Latin music